Roberto Iván Agustín Suárez (born 16 April 1979) is a Spanish retired footballer who played mainly as a midfielder.

He spent most of his career with Mirandés (three spells), competing with the club in all major levels but La Liga and appearing in more than 300 competitive matches.

Club career
Born in Logroño, La Rioja, Agustín began his senior career with CD Mirandés, moving in 2001 to Segunda División B side Amurrio Club. In the following summer he returned to his previous club, achieving promotion to that level in his first season.

In 2004, Agustín joined Algeciras CF also in division three, continuing to play in that tier in 2005–06, with Terrassa FC. He returned to Mirandés for a third stint afterwards, contributing 14 games in the 2011–12 campaign (1,020 minutes overall) as his team achieved promotion in the playoffs, reaching Segunda División for the first time in their history.

Agustín made his debut in the latter competition on 6 October 2012 – at the age of 33 years and five months – starting in a 1–2 home loss against Elche CF. He scored his first professional goal on 1 December 2013, but in a 3–1 defeat at CE Sabadell FC.

On 11 August 2014, aged 35, Agustín announced his retirement, being immediately appointed his last club's fitness coach.

References

External links

1979 births
Living people
Sportspeople from Logroño
Spanish footballers
Footballers from La Rioja (Spain)
Association football midfielders
Segunda División players
Segunda División B players
Tercera División players
Deportivo Alavés B players
CD Mirandés footballers
Amurrio Club footballers
Algeciras CF footballers
Terrassa FC footballers